Stewart Island shag was the former name of a species of cormorant that was split into two species as a result of genetic studies. The two resulting species are:

Otago shag, Leucocarbo chalconotus, which is endemic to coastal Otago, New Zealand
Foveaux shag, Leucocarbo stewarti, which is endemic to Stewart Island/Rakiura and Foveaux Strait in New Zealand

Some authorities, such as BirdLife and the International Union for Conservation of Nature, refer to these taxa as two subspecies of what they call Stewart shag.

References

Cormorants